Holy Rosary Church in Bridgeport is a Catholic Church in  Diocese of Bridgeport.

History
Formally known as Our Lady of Pompeii of the Holy Rosary, the Romanesque Revival-style church was built 1930 to the designs by the Brooklyn architect Anthony J. DePace of DePace & Juster to serve an originally Italian congregation on Bridgeport's East Side.

Holy Rosary Church is listed as a significant contributing property of the East Bridgeport National Register District.

References

External links
 Holy Rosary - Diocesan information
 Official website
 Diocese of Bridgeport

Romanesque Revival church buildings in Connecticut
Roman Catholic churches completed in 1930
Anthony J. DePace church buildings
Roman Catholic churches in Bridgeport, Connecticut
Italian-American culture in Connecticut
Roman Catholic Diocese of Bridgeport
Historic district contributing properties in Connecticut
National Register of Historic Places in Fairfield County, Connecticut
20th-century Roman Catholic church buildings in the United States